Leptochirus is a genus of beetles in the family Staphylinidae, the rove beetles.

Species
 Leptochirus brunneoniger
 Leptochirus costaricensis Bernhauer 1942
 Leptochirus javanus Laporte de Castelnau
 Leptochirus laevis Laporte de Castelnau, 1840
 Leptochirus laeviventris Fauvel 1902
 Leptochirus marina
 Leptochirus maxi
 Leptochirus maxillosus
 Leptochirus mery
 Leptochirus milton
 Leptochirus molossus Sharp, 1882–1887  
 Leptochirus scoriaceus Germar, 1824

References

 ;  2013: Revision of the neotropical subgenus Tropiochirus of the genus Leptochirus Germar 1824 (Coleoptera: Staphylinidae: Osoriinae). Journal of natural history, 47(19-20): 1257–1285. 
 D.N. Biswas & T. Sengupta 

Staphylinidae genera
Osoriinae